Schirdewan is a German language surname of slavic origin. Notable people with the name include:
 Karl Schirdewan (1907–1998), German Communist activist
 Martin Schirdewan (1975), German journalist and politician

References 

German-language surnames
Surnames of Silesian origin